Altic/Howard Hughes is a light rail station in Houston, Texas on the METRORail system. It is served by the Green Line and is located on Harrisburg Boulevard at Altic Street in the East End. The station is named for Altic Street as well as Howard Hughes, who built a Hughes Tool Company factory in the area.

Altic/Howard Hughes station opened on May 23, 2015, as part of the Green Line's first phase, serving as its eastern terminus. An extension opened on January 11, 2017, moving the terminus to Magnolia Park Transit Center.

References

METRORail stations
Railway stations in the United States opened in 2015
2015 establishments in Texas
Railway stations in Harris County, Texas